Saint Francis of Assisi Cathedral may refer to:

India
 Cathedral of St. Francis Assisi, Muzaffarpur
 St. Francis Assisi Cathedral, Ernakulam
 St. Francis of Assisi Cathedral , Bhopal
 Cathedral of St. Francis Assisi, Indore

Syria
 Saint Francis of Assisi Church, Aleppo an Eastern Roman Catholic church in Aleppo, Syria

United States
St. Francis of Assisi Cathedral (Metuchen, New Jersey)
Cathedral Basilica of St. Francis of Assisi, Santa Fe, New Mexico

Western Sahara
Cathedral of St Francis of Assisi, El Aaiún

See also 
 St. Francis of Assisi Church (disambiguation)